A trade bloc  is a type of intergovernmental agreement, often part of a regional intergovernmental organization, where barriers to trade (tariffs and others) are reduced or eliminated among the participating states.

Trade blocs can be stand-alone agreements between several states (such as the USMCA) or part of a regional organization (such as the European Union). Depending on the level of economic integration, trade blocs can be classified as preferential trading areas, free-trade areas, customs unions, common markets, or economic and monetary unions.

Use

Historic trading blocs include the Hanseatic League, a Northern European economic alliance between the 12th and 17th centuries, and the German Customs Union, formed on the basis of the German Confederation and subsequently the German Empire from 1871. Surges of trade bloc formation occurred in the 1960s and 1970s, as well as in the 1990s after the collapse of Communism. By 1997, more than 50% of all world commerce was conducted within regional trade blocs. Economist Jeffrey J. Schott of the Peterson Institute for International Economics notes that members of successful trade blocs usually share four common traits: similar levels of per capita GNP, geographic proximity, similar or compatible trading regimes, and political commitment to regional organization.

Some advocates of global free trade are opposed to trading blocs. Trade blocs are seen by them to encourage regional free trade at the expense of global free trade. Those who advocate for it claim that global free trade is in the interest of every country, as it would create more opportunities to turn local resources into goods and services that are both currently in demand and will be in demand in the future by consumers. However, scholars and economists continue to debate whether regional trade blocs fragment the global economy or encourage the extension of the existing global multilateral trading system.

Terminology 
A common market is seen as a stage of economic integration towards an economic union or possibly towards the goal of a unified market.

A single market is a type of trade bloc in which most trade barriers have been removed (for goods) with some common policies on product regulation, and freedom of movement of the factors of production (capital and labour) and of enterprise and services.

Statistics

Comparison between regional trade blocs

1 not all members participating
2 involving goods, services, telecommunications, transport (full liberalisation of railways from 2012), energy (full liberalisation from 2007)
3 telecommunications, transport and energy - proposed
4 sensitive goods to be covered from 2019 
5 least developed members to join from 2012 
6 least developed members to join from 2017 
7 Additionally some non member states also participate (the European Union, EFTA have overlapping membership and various common initiatives regarding the European integration).
8 Additionally some non member states also participate (ASEAN Plus Three)
9 Limited to "entitled persons" and duration of one year.

See also

 Regional integration
 Continental union

Lists of trade blocs
List of preferential trade areas
List of free trade areas (bilateral, multilateral)
List of customs unions
List of common markets
List of economic unions
List of monetary unions
List of customs and monetary unions
List of economic and monetary unions

References

Bibliography

 Mansfield, Edward D. and Helen V. Milner, "The New Wave of Regionalism" in 
 Milner, Helen V., "International Trade" in